Water Valley is a city in Yalobusha County, Mississippi, United States. The population was 3,392 at the 2010 census. It is the larger of two county seats in the rural county, and at one time was the center of railroad shops.

Geography

Demographics

2020 census

As of the 2020 United States Census, there were 3,380 people, 1,336 households, and 818 families residing in the city.

2000 census
At the 2000 census there were 3,677 people in 1,470 households, including 961 families, in the city. The population density was 523.2 people per square mile (201.9/km). There were 1,675 housing units at an average density of 238.3 per square mile (92.0/km). The racial makeup of the city was 57.87% White, 40.74% African American, 0.33% Native American, 0.16% Asian, 0.22% Pacific Islander, 0.19% from other races, and 0.49% from two or more races. Hispanic or Latino of any race were 1.20%.

Of the 1,470 households 30.0% had children under the age of 18 living with them, 39.0% were married couples living together, 23.2% had a female householder with no husband present, and 34.6% were non-families. 31.8% of households were one person and 16.2% were one person aged 65 or older. The average household size was 2.43 and the average family size was 3.07.

The age distribution was 26.5% under the age of 18, 8.9% from 18 to 24, 26.2% from 25 to 44, 21.1% from 45 to 64, and 17.3% 65 or older. The median age was 37 years. For every 100 females, there were 81.3 males. For every 100 females age 18 and over, there were 74.3 males.

The median household income was $23,777 and the median family income was $31,083. Males had a median income of $26,888 versus $20,127 for females. The per capita income for the city was $13,324. About 23.7% of families and 26.9% of the population were below the poverty line, including 37.5% of those under age 18 and 15.9% of those age 65 or over.

Education
The City of Water Valley is served by the Water Valley School District.

Notable people
Hubert Creekmore (1907–1966), author
James A. Ford (1911–1968), archaeologist
Lloyd L. Gaines, plaintiff in Missouri ex rel. Gaines v. Canada
Kevin Horan, attorney and member of the Mississippi House of Representatives
Casey Jones (1864–1900), railroad engineer
John William Meece, (1843–1924), member of the Mississippi Legislature in 1911
Bryant Mix (born 1974), NFL player
 Ray Terrell (1919–1997), World War II veteran and professional football player

References

External links

 Water Valley Chamber of Commerce

Cities in Mississippi
Cities in Yalobusha County, Mississippi
County seats in Mississippi